Mario Preisig (born 10 September 1954) is a retired Swiss football midfielder.

References

1954 births
Living people
Swiss men's footballers
FC Chiasso players
Swiss Super League players
Association football midfielders
FC Chiasso managers
Swiss football managers